Landslide is a 1937 British drama film directed by Donovan Pedelty and starring Jimmy Hanley, Dinah Sheridan and Jimmy Mageean. It was made at Wembley Studios as a quota quickie for release by Paramount Pictures.

Synopsis
A Welsh theatre is hit by a landslide, trapping its actors inside.

Cast
 Jimmy Hanley as Jimmy Haddon  
 Dinah Sheridan as Dinah Shaw  
 Jimmy Mageean as Harry McGovern  
 Ann Cavanagh as Lena Petrie  
 Elizabeth Inglis as Vera Grant  
 Bruno Barnabe as Bob White  
 David Arnold as Sgt. Llewellyn

References

Bibliography
Chibnall, Steve. Quota Quickies: The Birth of the British 'B' Film. British Film Institute, 2007.
Low, Rachael. Filmmaking in 1930s Britain. George Allen & Unwin, 1985.
Wood, Linda. British Films, 1927–1939. British Film Institute, 1986.

External links

1937 films
British drama films
British black-and-white films
1937 drama films
Films directed by Donovan Pedelty
Films shot at Wembley Studios
Films set in Wales
1930s English-language films
1930s British films